Harpactes is a genus of birds in the family Trogonidae found in forests in South and Southeast Asia, extending into southernmost China. They are strongly sexually dimorphic, with females generally being duller than males. Their back is brownish, the tail is partially white (best visible from below), and males of most species have red underparts. They feed on arthropods, small lizards and fruit.

Two species, cinnamon-rumped and scarlet-rumped trogons, were previously classified in a separate genus, Duvaucelius, and a 2010 study found that these two were closely related and formed a separate clade from all of the other Harpactes trogons (except orange-breasted trogon, which forms a third group), but recommended that all three groups should be treated as congeneric. This same study also found that the genus Apalharpactes, containing two species sometimes included in Harpactes, is actually distantly related and thus a valid genus.

Species

References
 Allen, R. (2001). Genus Harpactes. pp. 106–111 in: del Hoyo, J., A. Elliott, & J. Sargatal. eds. (2001). Handbook of the Birds of the World. Vol. 6. Mousebirds to Hornbills. Lynx Edicions, Barcelona. 

 
Bird genera
Taxa named by William John Swainson